Albert Heijn is the largest supermarket chain in the Netherlands with a market share of 34.8% in 2020. It was founded in 1887, and has been part of Ahold Delhaize since 2016.

History
The chain was founded on 27 May 1887, when Albert Heijn bought a grocery store from his father Jan Heijn in Oostzaan. In the following years, Heijn opened other locations in several cities and in 1899, he opened a central warehouse in Zaandam.

From 1895, Heijn started roasting his own brand of coffee in a laundry room in his Oostzaan location and in 1910, several other self-produced items were added, including confectionery, cakes and pastry. Until 1913, these products were produced in an old town house in Zaandam, but the company built a professional factory on this spot in 1913.

In 1920, all enterprises were combined in the Maatschappij tot Exploitatie der Fabrieken en Handelszaken. Anton Jurgens, one of the founders of Unilever, took a 50% share within the new company. These shares were bought back by the family Heijn in 1927. On 29 April 1920, Albert Heijn transferred control of the company to his sons Gerrit Heijn and Jan Heijn, and his son-in-law Johan Hille. Albert Heijn stayed on as president of the board.

Albert Heijn Sr. benefited from the industrialization that brought prosperity through fixed wages for factory workers and a new group of rich people. Eating habits changed: less in quantity but more and other types of items. Due to the rise of manufacturers and prepackaged items, indigenous and exclusive products came within reach.

The chain went public in 1948, and underwent two major changes in the 1950s. The first change was in 1952, with the introduction of their first self-service store and the second change was in 1955, with the opening of their first supermarket.

The chain could become the largest within the Netherlands via several acquisitions. Notable (partial) acquisitions were Van Amerongen (1950), Simon de Wit (1972) and C1000 (2008 and parts in 2012).

Ahold NV was founded on August 27, 1973 and Albert Heijn became part of it. The new construction made it easier for Albert Heijn's new parent company to enter the foreign market. In October of the same year, Etos was acquired, a number of stores were converted into Albert Heijn and the rest continued as a drugstore within Ahold.

At the beginning of 2003, Albert Heijn saw its market share fall sharply: 22.8 percent against 24.7 percent a year earlier. In order to win back customers and leave the expensive image behind, Albert Heijn decided to start a large-scale price reduction in the same year. The chain permanently reduced the price of thousands of items every so often.

At the end of 2006, managing director Dick Boer announced that Albert Heijn would stop lowering prices. The price difference with the competitors was successfully reduced by many percent. The market share was almost 30 percent at the end of 2006. 

In 2007, the company crossed the ocean with the opening of a franchise store in Curaçao, this shop remained open until 2016, when it was changed to a different brand. The company entered the Belgian market in 2011, with the opening of a store in Brasschaat. Despite the merger of Ahold and Delhaize, Albert Heijn and Delhaize both remained active in Belgium. Currently Albert Heijn has 60 stores. After Curaçao and Belgium the company entered the German market with their AH To Go formula. This venture ended in 2018.

Simon de Wit

Simon de Wit was a large family-owned chain of supermarkets in the Netherlands. The company was founded by Simon de Wit (1852–1934), who after his father's death in 1867 started a grocery store from his parental house in Wormerveer. In 1888 he opened the first branch in Amsterdam and by 1900 he ran stores at 30 different locations and owned a central warehouse in Zaandam.

In 1954 the opening of the 150th store was celebrated. In 1970, when Simon de Wit's grandson Simon was in charge, a fire destroyed the central warehouse in Zaandam. Soon after, Albert Heijn, which also originated in the Zaanstreek, showed interest in a takeover and in 1973 Simon de Wit merged with Albert Heijn, with all employees retaining their jobs. All remaining shops took on the name of the latter.

Formulas

Albert Heijn 

This formula is most used throughout the Netherlands and Belgium and is their regular store format. Since 2018, the company began to roll out the concept Echt Vers in which the stores would be remodelled to offer 10–15% more fresh produce.

Albert Heijn also distinguishes itself by the steadily growing range of organic and ecological products, reducing the use of plastics and investing in sustainable construction and transport. The expansion of the sustainable range was brought under the umbrella brand "Puur & Eerlijk" in 2009, under the leadership of Dick Boer, with adjustments to stricter certification and change of packaging. The retail chain is also committed to reducing food waste.

AH To Go 

In 1999, the chain developed a new formula for a convenience store on request of the Nederlandse Spoorwegen, the railway company would become a franchisee and opened the first store on Station 's-Hertogenbosch. The formula got its current name in 2001, and specialises in products that customers need on their commute.

Since 2019, the company is testing a new version of the formule without staff and cash registers. The customer scans their debit card and cameras register the customer and the items that are picked, after the customer leaves the right amount is deducted from their account. The new concept and technology was tested in a mobile unit that has been placed at the headquarters of Ahold Delhaize and Schiphol.

AH XL 
Since 2002, the company operates several hypermarkets with a larger variety of products in both food and non-food. Within the store there are also several chefs preparing take-away.

Albert Heijn Online 
The company started testing delivery in 1999, with the Albert Heijn Thuisservice, which was renamed Albert.nl in 2001. Via this channel customers could purchase their groceries, but also products from sister-companies Etos and Gall & Gall. The Albert brand was discontinued in 2014, and the delivery service was integrated in the Albert Heijn brand.

Organisation and brand value 
Since 1899, the chain is headquartered in Zaandam, their parent company is also located here. The chain operates six distribution centres in Nieuwegein, Geldermalsen, Zaandam, Tilburg, Pijnacker and Zwolle. In addition to an ever-growing impressive number of stores - both franchise and in-house - the chain also operates seven "Home Shop Centers" in Almere, Eindhoven, Rotterdam, De Meern, Amsterdam, Oosterhout and Bleiswijk.

The brand value of Albert Heijn was 866 million dollars in 2014, according to Trademark Office Interbrand. This put Albert Heijn in 26th place in the European brand values top 50. 

Recent information about the brand value cannot be found publicly.

Trivia 

 From 1927, the chain was allowed to call itself Purveyor to the Royal Household. In addition, Ahold was awarded the Royal Predicate in 1987, due to the 100th anniversary of Albert Heijn. King Willem-Alexander granted permission in 2016, that the merged company Ahold Delhaize could also continue to use the predicate.
 All acquisitions of other retail chains in the Netherlands (van Amerongen in 1950, Simon de Wit, C1000, Deen) were or soon became expansions of stores under Albert Heijn brand. The weaknesses in the policy, which forced the chains to be taken over, could be better tackled centrally controlled from Zaandam and under Albert Heijn brand.
 Albert Heijn started advertising early in it's development. In the 30s, for example, with the slogan: "Mother! There's Albert Heijn". And a picture of home delivery. The advertising campaign of the 30s - that of Albert Heijn, with an annual turnover of 15 million guilders - was "Stop! There's Boffie with Albert Heijn's coffee". A campaign that made the talk of the town for the first time.
 Albert Heijn has a long history of merchandising campaigns: for example collecting pictures including a textbook, a campaign to obtain a refrigerator where already launched during the 50s.
 The current Albert Heijn logo has existed since 1965, and is a design by James Pilditch and John Harris of agency AID. The logo has been enclosed with a blue house since 2003.
 The company introduced the Bonuskaart in 1998, which gave cardholders a discount on selected products. The program was changed in 2013, and with their new card customers could also receive a personal discount.
 In 2007, the supermarket founded the Albert Heijn Foundation together with suppliers of fresh produce. It mainly invests in local projects in the field of housing, education and health. The AH Foundation works closely with ICCO and FairMatch Support to select and realize projects in areas such as water supplies and education.
 Albert Heijn published stickers for WhatsApp and iMessage in cooperation with Sticker Maker in August, 2021.

See also
 Ahold as one of the merging partners of Ahold Delhaize
 List of supermarket chains in the Netherlands
 List of hypermarkets in the Netherlands
 Albert Czech Republic

References

External links

Official website 
Official Belgium 

Ahold Delhaize
Convenience stores
Retail companies of the Netherlands
Supermarkets of the Netherlands
Retail companies established in 1887
1887 establishments
Companies established in 1887
Companies based in North Holland
Companies of the Netherlands
Dutch brands
Oostzaan
Dutch companies established in 1887
Supermarkets
Zaandam